Paula Matthusen (born 1978) is an American composer of acoustic and electro-acoustic music and educator. She is a recipient of the Rome Prize from the American Academy in Rome.

Biography 
Paula Matthusen was born in 1978 in Arizona. She attended University of Wisconsin–Madison; and has a M.A. degree and Ph.D. from New York University.

Matthusen has taught music at Florida International University, Wesleyan University, and Columbia University. Her music has been performed by Bang-On-A-Can All Stars, International Contemporary Ensemble, Alarm Will Sound, Estonian National Ballet, Kathleen Supové, Todd Reynolds, and Kathryn Woodard.

Discography 
 the old language is the old language... (percussion duo, 2017)
 old fires catch old buildings (baritone, trumpet, bass clarinet, trombone, 2017)
 corpo/cage (2009)
 run-on sentence of the pavement (piano, ping-pong balls and electronics, 2003)

References

External links 

 

1978 births
Musicians from Arizona
Florida International University faculty
Wesleyan University faculty
Columbia University faculty
Living people
University of Wisconsin–Madison alumni
New York University alumni